James Womack was an American baseball first baseman in the Negro leagues. He played from 1924 to 1933 with several teams.

References

External links
 and Seamheads

Year of birth missing
Place of birth missing
Year of death missing
Place of death missing
Baltimore Black Sox players
Cleveland Tigers (baseball) players
Pollock's Cuban Stars players
Indianapolis ABCs (1931–1933) players
St. Louis Stars (baseball) players
Baseball infielders